Kinkaiyama Ryū (born 7 January 1976 as Ryusui Kin) is a former sumo wrestler from Ōmura, Nagasaki, Japan. He made his professional debut in March 1991, and reached the top division in July 1998. His highest rank was maegashira 6. He retired in May 2006, and as of 2016 he is an elder in the Japan Sumo Association under the name Takasaki.

He was responsible for the "Ozumo Beyond 2020 Tournament" held in the Ryogoku Kokugikan in October 2017 to increase awareness of sumo among minority groups such as foreigners and people with disabilities, in preparation for the Tokyo 2020 Olympics.

He was married in February 2005.

Career record

See also
Glossary of sumo terms
List of sumo tournament second division champions
List of past sumo wrestlers
List of sumo elders

References

External links

1976 births
Living people
Japanese sumo wrestlers
Sumo people from Nagasaki Prefecture
Japanese people of Korean descent